Rudolf Vojtěch Špillar (11 February 1878, Pilsen - 22 March 1949, Prague) was a Czech painter and photographer; on the subject of which he wrote several manuals.

Life and work 
His father was a financial officer for the city of Pilsen. His brothers, Jaroslav and Karel also became painters. After completing his primary education, he found a position as a civil servant and worked as an amateur photographer; one of the first to practice pictorialism. In 1908, together with a professional photographer named Jan Špriňar, he wrote a Compendium of Practical Photography for Amateurs. It became very popular throughout Austria-Hungary and was reissued in several new editions after the establishment of Czechoslovakia.

After that, he undertook several study trips to Germany, France and Italy. He came to specialize in still-lifes, nudes, portraits and landscapes. Despite becoming quite proficient, he remained mostly an amateur as a painter, although he exhibited regularly at the Rubeš Gallery. His total output was, as might be expected, rather small.

He died at the age of seventy-one and was interred at the Vinohrady Cemetery.

References

External links 

 Works by and about Rudolf Vojtěch Špillar @ the National Library of the Czech Republic
 Entry on Rudolf Vojtěch Špillar @ AbART

1878 births
1949 deaths
Czech painters
Czech photographers
Landscape painters
Czech portrait painters
Czech still life painters
Artists from Plzeň
Austro-Hungarian writers